Morningthorpe (sometimes Morning Thorpe) is a village and former civil parish, now in the parish of Morningthorpe and Fritton in the South Norfolk district, in the county of Norfolk, England. The parish includes the villages of Morningthorpe and Fritton. The two villages are 1 km apart.

The village's name origin is uncertain perhaps, 'outlying farm/settlement of the pool dwellers', 'outlying farm/settlement of the boundary dwellers' or 'outlying farm/settlement of Maera's people'.

The churches of Morningthorpe St John the Baptist and Fritton St Catherine are two of 124 existing round-tower churches in Norfolk.

The village was struck by an F1/T2 tornado on 23 November 1981, as part of the record-breaking nationwide tornado outbreak on that day.

Morningthorpe round tower
Morningthorpe has a round tower rather larger than that at neighbouring Long Stratton: the tower appears to bulge out about halfway up, which, according to the article in Round Tower magazine September 2004, may be evidence of an octagonal tower built inside a round one. The article has photographs of repair work done to the tower in 1988 - one shows a corner of an "octagon" inner tower core, not bonded to the outside, while another suggests a bonded, and rounded, core. There are narrow openings in the tower with monolithic heads in worn pale stone, the openings filled with old-looking wooden boards pierced with vertical rows of round holes. Taylor & Taylor, Anglo-Saxon Architecture seek to assign this tower to the later Saxon period (or earlier Norman).

Civil parish 
On 1 April 1935, the parish of Fritton was merged with Morning Thorpe. The new parish was renamed from "Morning Thorpe" to "Morningthorpe and Fritton" on 1 May 2012. In 1931 the parish of Morning Thorpe (prior to the merge) had a population of 110.

Notable people
The ornithologist Howard Irby was born here in 1833 at Boyland Hall. The hall was demolished in 1947.

Paulina Irby, the campaigner for Bosnian Serb refugees was born here in 1831.

British racing driver St. John Horsfall was born here in 1910.

The author Joseph Dickerson was born here in 1943.

Tommy Hicks – later the entertainer Tommy Steele, and his family, were evacuated here from London during World War Two.

References

 Ordnance Survey (1999). OS Explorer Map 237 - Norwich. .
 Office for National Statistics & Norfolk County Council (2001). Census population and household counts for unparished urban areas and all parishes. Retrieved 2 December 2005.
 Morningthorpe parish information South Norfolk Council
 http://kepn.nottingham.ac.uk/map/place/Norfolk/Morning%20Thorpe

External links
 for Morningthorpe village
 for Fritton village
Information from Genuki Norfolk on Morningthorpe.
Information from Genuki Norfolk on Fritton.
St John the Baptist's on the European Round Tower Churches Website 
St Catherine's on the European Round Tower Churches Website 

 
Villages in Norfolk
South Norfolk